Bistra Glacier is  long and  wide glacier on the northwest side of Imeon Range on Smith Island in the South Shetland Islands, Antarctica.  It is situated southwest of Chuprene Glacier and northwest of Dragoman Glacier, drains the west slopes of Mount Foster and the north slopes of Slaveykov Peak, and flows northwestwards of Zavet Saddle to enter Drake Passage south of Garmen Point.

The glacier is named after the settlements of Bistra in northeastern Bulgaria.

Location
Bulgarian mapping in 2009.

See also
 List of glaciers in the Antarctic
 Glaciology

Maps
Chart of South Shetland including Coronation Island, &c. from the exploration of the sloop Dove in the years 1821 and 1822 by George Powell Commander of the same. Scale ca. 1:200000. London: Laurie, 1822.
  L.L. Ivanov. Antarctica: Livingston Island and Greenwich, Robert, Snow and Smith Islands. Scale 1:120000 topographic map. Troyan: Manfred Wörner Foundation, 2010.  (First edition 2009. )
 South Shetland Islands: Smith and Low Islands. Scale 1:150000 topographic map No. 13677. British Antarctic Survey, 2009.
 Antarctic Digital Database (ADD). Scale 1:250000 topographic map of Antarctica. Scientific Committee on Antarctic Research (SCAR). Since 1993, regularly upgraded and updated.
 L.L. Ivanov. Antarctica: Livingston Island and Smith Island. Scale 1:100000 topographic map. Manfred Wörner Foundation, 2017.

References
 Bulgarian Antarctic Gazetteer. Antarctic Place-names Commission. (details in Bulgarian, basic data in English)
 Bistra Glacier. SCAR Composite Antarctic Gazetteer

External links
 Bistra Glacier. Copernix satellite image

Glaciers of Smith Island (South Shetland Islands)
Bulgaria and the Antarctic